Flame of Youth may refer to:
 Flame of Youth (1949 film), an American drama film
 Flame of Youth (1920 film), an American silent drama film
 The Flame of Youth, a 1917 American silent adventure film